Vernouillet is a commune in the Eure-et-Loir department in northern France.

It lies adjacent to the south side of the town of Dreux.

Population

Vernouillet Airport
Built prior to World War II as a civil airport, Vernouillet Airport was seized by the Germans in June 1940 during the Battle of France. They used it as a major Luftwaffe military airfield during the occupation. It was liberated by Allied ground forces about 21 August 1944 during the Northern France Campaign. It was then used by the United States Army Air Force Ninth Air Force as a combat Advanced Landing Ground. Declared operational on 26 August, the airfield was designated as "A-41", and was used by combat units until the end of the war. Afterward the airport was returned to civil control. The airport was closed after the war due to a conflict of airspace with the expanding Orly Airport near Paris, and is now a small grass airfield general aviation airport with no commercial traffic.

Twin towns – sister cities

Vernouillet is twinned with:
 Cheddar, England, United Kingdom
 Felsberg, Germany

Notable people
Louis-Nicolas Robert (1761–1828), inventor of the Fourdrinier machine. He is commemorated by a statue in front of the church. Also, the Collège de Louis-Nicolas Robert in the quartier des Grandes Vauvettes is named in his honour.

See also
Communes of the Eure-et-Loir department

References

External links

Official website (in French)

Communes of Eure-et-Loir